May 6 - Eastern Orthodox Church calendar - May 8

All fixed commemorations below celebrated on May 20 by Orthodox Churches on the Old Calendar.

For May 7th, Orthodox Churches on the Old Calendar commemorate the Saints listed on April 24.

Saints
 Martyrs Quadratus (Codratos) of Nicomedia and his companions (251–259)  (see also March 7)
 Martyrs Rufinus and Saturninus
 Martyr Maximus
 Hieromartyr Flavius, and Martyrs Augustus and Augustinus (from Asia Minor) (c. 284 - 305)
 Martyr Acacius the centurion at Byzantium (303)
 The Venerable Fathers of Georgia: Saint John of Zedazeni (Zedazeni Monastery) in Georgia, and his 12 disciples (6th century):
Shio of Mgvime; David of Gareji, (see also: David Gareja monastery complex); Anthony of Martqopi; Thaddeus of Urbnisi or Stepantsminda; Stephen of Khirsa; Isidore of Samtavisi; Michael of Ulumbo; Pyrrhus of Breta; Zeno of Iqalto; Jesse (Ise) of Tsilkani; Joseph of Alaverdi; Abibus of Nekressi 
 Righteous Tarasius the Wonderworker of Lycaonia  (see also March 8 and March 9)
 Saint John the Confessor, of Psychaita, on the Bosphorus (c. 825)  (see also May 26)

Pre-Schism Western saints
 Martyr Juvenal of Benevento (132 AD)
 Saint Domitianus of Maastricht, bishop (560)
 Saints Serenicus and Serenus, two brothers who became monks and later settled as hermits near the River Sarthe in France (c. 669)
 Saint Placid (Placidus, Plait), Benedictine Abbot of the basilica monastery of St Symphorian in Autun, France (675)
 Saint John of Beverley, Bishop of York (721)  (see also: March 7)
 Saint Peter of Pavia (735)

Post-Schism Orthodox saints
 Venerable Nilus of Sora, abbot and wonderworker (1508)
 New Monkmartyr Pachomius of Mount Athos, of Usaki near Philadelphia (1730)  (see also: May 21)
 Saint Alexis Toth, Confessor and Defender of Orthodoxy in America (1909)

Other commemorations
 Commemoration of the Apparition of the Sign of the Precious Cross over Jerusalem in 351 A.D.
 Uncovering of the relics of St. Euthymius the Great (473)
 Uncovering of the relics (1815) of Saint Nilus the Myrrh-gusher of Mount Athos (1651)
 Repose of Schema-Elder Boris of Valaam and Pskov (1967)
 Repose of Hieromonk Eulogius of Valaam (1969)

Icons
 Icon of the Mother of God of Liubech (11th century)
 "Zhirovits" Icon of the Most Holy Theotokos (found on a pear tree) (1470)

Icon gallery

Notes

References

Sources
 May 7, 2011, OCA - The Lives of the Saints.
 Complete List of Saints. Protection of the Mother of God Church (POMOG).
 May 7/20, Orthodox Calendar (PRAVOSLAVIE.RU)
 VALAAM  PATERICON.
 Dr. Alexander Roman. May. Calendar of Ukrainian Orthodox Saints (Ukrainian Orthodoxy - Українське Православ'я).
 May 7. Latin Saints of the Orthodox Patriarchate of Rome.
 May 7, The Roman Martyrology.
Greek Sources
 Great Synaxaristes:  7 ΜΑΪΟΥ, ΜΕΓΑΣ ΣΥΝΑΞΑΡΙΣΤΗΣ.
  Συναξαριστής. 7 Μαΐου. ECCLESIA.GR. (H ΕΚΚΛΗΣΙΑ ΤΗΣ ΕΛΛΑΔΟΣ). 
Russian Sources
  20 мая (7 мая). Православная Энциклопедия под редакцией Патриарха Московского и всея Руси Кирилла (электронная версия). (Orthodox Encyclopedia - Pravenc.ru).
  7 мая (ст.ст.) 20 мая 2013 (нов. ст.). Русская Православная Церковь Отдел внешних церковных связей. (DECR).

May in the Eastern Orthodox calendar